Jordan Davis (born June 9, 1992) is an American football coach who is the offensive coordinator and wide receivers coach for North Texas Mean Green football team.

Playing career
Davis grew up in Arlington, Texas and attended Arlington High School. He played both wide receiver and safety for the football team and was named All-District 5A-4 on defense as a junior and senior.

Davis began his college football career at Southwestern Oklahoma State. He caught 20 passes for 225 yards and a team-leading three touchdowns in 11 games as a freshman. Following the end of the season Davis transferred to Texas Tech University and joined the Red Raiders as a walk-on. He had seven receptions for 58 yards in his first season at Texas Tech and earned a scholarship at the end of the year. Davis's receivers coach as a senior was Eric Morris.

Coaching career
Davis began his coaching career as a graduate assistant at Texas Tech in 2016. He was hired by Morris as the wide receivers coach at the University of the Incarnate Word (UIW) in 2018 as part of Morris's inaugural staff. Davis was named the Cardinals' associate head coach in addition to wide receivers coach after two seasons at UIW. He was hired as an offensive analyst at Washington State in 2022 shortly after Morris was hired as the Cougars' offensive coordinator. Davis followed Morris again after he was hired as the head coach at North Texas and was named offensive coordinator and wide receivers coach.

References

External links
 Texas Tech Red Raiders player bio
 UIW Cardinals coaching bio

1992 births
Living people
American football wide receivers
Texas Tech Red Raiders football players
North Texas Mean Green football coaches
Incarnate Word Cardinals football coaches
Texas Tech Red Raiders football coaches
Southwestern Oklahoma State Bulldogs football players
Washington State Cougars football coaches